The opossum rat (Rattus marmosurus) is a species of rodent in the family Muridae.
It is found only in northern and central Sulawesi, Indonesia.

References

Rattus
Rats of Asia
Endemic fauna of Indonesia
Rodents of Sulawesi
Mammals described in 1921
Taxa named by Oldfield Thomas
Taxonomy articles created by Polbot